The Women's skeet event at the 2012 Olympic Games took place on 29 July 2012 at the Royal Artillery Barracks.

The event consisted of two rounds: a qualifier and a final. In the qualifier, each shooter fired 3 sets of 25 shots in the set order of skeet shooting.

The top 6 shooters in the qualifying round moved on to the final round. There, they fired one additional round of 25. The total score from all 100 shots was used to determine final ranking. Ties are broken using a shoot-off; additional shots are fired one at a time until there is no longer a tie.

Records
Prior to this competition, the existing world and Olympic records were as follows.

Qualification round

Final

References

Shooting at the 2012 Summer Olympics
Olymp
Women's events at the 2012 Summer Olympics